Jack Barry (born 1990s) is a Gaelic footballer who plays for the Na Gaeil club and the Kerry county team.

Underage 

Barry played for the Kerry minor team in 2012 and the 2015 under-21 team, bit had little success in either grade. 

He made his league debut against Donegal in 2017 and his senior championship debut against Clare in 2017.

Barry started for Kerry in the 2019 All-Ireland Senior Football Championship Final drawn game, departing late on with an injury, but was back for the start of the replay.

Honours

Na Gaeil

Kerry Intermediate Football Championship (1) 2021
Munster Intermediate Club Football Championship (1) 2021
Kerry Junior Football Championship (1) 2019
Munster Junior Club Football Championship (1) 2019
All-Ireland Junior Club Football Championship (1) 2020

St Brendan's District
Kerry Minor Football Championship (1): 2012

Kerry

Munster Senior Football Championship: (4) 2017, 2018, 2019, 2021
National Football League: (3) 2017, 2020, 2021 (shared)
McGrath Cup: (1) 2017

References

1994 births
Living people
Kerry inter-county Gaelic footballers